Saint-Marcel (also known as Saint-Marcel-en-Dombes, literally Saint-Marcel in Dombes) is a commune in the Ain department in eastern France.

Population

See also
Communes of the Ain department

References

Communes of Ain